The 1798 New York gubernatorial election was held in April 1798 to elect the Governor and Lieutenant Governor of New York.

Candidates
The Federalist Party nominated incumbent John Jay. They nominated incumbent Stephen Van Rensselaer for Lieutenant Governor.

The Democratic-Republican Party nominated Chancellor of New York Robert R. Livingston. They also nominated incumbent Stephen Van Rensselaer for Lieutenant Governor.

Results
The Federalist ticket of Jay and Van Rensselaer was elected.

Sources
Result: The Tribune Almanac 1841

See also
New York gubernatorial elections
New York state elections

1798
New York
Gubernatorial
John Jay